Isaiah Champion Jewett (born February 6, 1997) is an Olympic American middle-distance runner who specialises in the 800m.

Career
On June 21, 2021, at the United States Olympic Trials held in Eugene, Oregon, he finished runner up with a personal best time of 1:43.85 behind Olympic bronze medalist Clayton Murphy. It was particularly poignant for Jewett as the race was close to the anniversary of his brother Robert's death. Jewett had won the NCAA 800m title on the same Hayward Field track just 10 days previously. A student at the University of Southern California, Jewett had to finish a 10-page essay by midnight immediately after his Olympic-qualifying run because his professor did not grant an extension.  His NCAA winning time of 1:44.68 took him to #1 on the USC all time list, ahead of Olympians Ibrahim Okash and Duane Solomon.  He holds the same position on the USC Indoor top 10 from earlier in the 2021 season as well as #5 in the 400 meters.

While at Cathedral High School in Los Angeles, Jewett focused more on the 400 meters.  He finished 7th at the 2015 CIF California State Meet.  He spent the 2016 and 2017 seasons at U.C. Irvine.  In his first year of taking the 800 seriously, he went undefeated in the 2017 regular season and won the Big West Championship.  Transferring to USC, he had to sit out the 2018 collegiate season, so he ran unattached in USATF events.

Jewett ran in heat one at the 2020 Olympic Games 800 metres with a time of 1:45.07 to qualify for the semi final.

References

1997 births
Living people
American male middle-distance runners
USC Trojans men's track and field athletes
Sportspeople from Inglewood, California
Athletes (track and field) at the 2020 Summer Olympics
Olympic track and field athletes of the United States
21st-century American people